Pseudoredtenbacheria is a genus of parasitic flies in the family Tachinidae.

Species
Pseudoredtenbacheria brasiliensis (Schiner, 1868)
Pseudoredtenbacheria fulvipennis (Wulp, 1890)
Pseudoredtenbacheria succincta (Wulp, 1890)

References

Tachinidae genera
Exoristinae
Taxa named by Friedrich Moritz Brauer
Taxa named by Julius von Bergenstamm
Diptera of South America
Diptera of North America